Hempstead Gardens is a station along the West Hempstead Branch of the Long Island Rail Road. It is located on Hempstead Gardens Drive and Chestnut Street and is one of three stations in West Hempstead, New York.

History
When Hempstead Gardens station was originally built in 1893 by the New York Bay Extension Railroad, it was little more than a small one-room shack with open canopies extending along the northbound platform. At some point between the 1950s and 1972, the shack was replaced by an open sheltered shed. High-level platforms were added to both sides during the 1990s.

Station layout
Hempstead Gardens station has a single track and one four-car-long side platform on its east side that is compliant with the Americans with Disabilities Act of 1990. However, the second track for the West Hempstead Branch begins just northeast of this station. The right-of-way for the second track exists here as well.

This station is one of the few stations on the LIRR, outside New York City, with no parking facilities. The station has two daily ticket machines located near the waiting room.

References

External links

Unofficial LIRR History Website
End of second track(February 1999)
Platformed shelter from tracks and from parking lot (June 2006)
 Station from Chestnut Street entrance from Google Maps Street View
Platform from Google Maps Street View

Long Island Rail Road stations in Nassau County, New York
Railway stations in the United States opened in 1893
1893 establishments in New York (state)